The second season of American drama thriller series Quantico premiered in the United States on American Broadcasting Company (ABC) on September 25, 2016, and concluded on May 15, 2017. The season was produced by ABC Studios, with series creator Joshua Safran, Mark Gordon, Robert Sertner, Nicholas Pepper and Jorge Zamacona serving as executive producers.

Season two consists of twenty-two episodes; it follows Alex Parrish (Priyanka Chopra), who has been working undercover for the FBI as a CIA recruit to uncover a rogue faction called the AIC. The narrative is told through dual timelines until the thirteenth episode; it switches between the present—where Parrish must confront a terrorist-instigated hostage crisis at the G-20 summit in New York City—and the past, where she is training at the CIA's mysterious training facility "The Farm" with other trainees, revealing links between the two incidents. The narrative switches to a single timeline from the fourteenth episode.

The season aired on Sundays in the United States at 10:00 pm, before moving to Mondays at 10:00 pm after its mid-season break. The second season was well-received by television critics but struggled with the ratings, averaging 4.53 million viewers. For portraying Alex Parrish, Chopra won the 2017's People's Choice Award for Favorite Dramatic TV Actress.

Overview
As season two begins, Alex Parrish and Ryan Booth are working undercover for the FBI at "The Farm" as CIA recruits. Their mission is to uncover the mastermind behind the rogue faction of the CIA called the AIC. In the future, the President of the United States, the First Lady and several other world leaders are being held hostage at the G-20 summit in New York City by a group of terrorists called the Citizens Liberation Front. 

The group's real agenda is to get the surveillance drives from the world leaders before the AIC, who are hiding among the hostages. Two weeks after the hostage crisis ends, President Claire Haas and CIA director Matthew Keyes put forth a covert joint FBI-CIA task force to expose a syndicate of eight collaborators who were secretly involved in orchestrating the hostage crisis. After the collaborators gain access to the sensitive intelligence, Alex is reinstated as an FBI agent and is hired as a member of the task force along with Ryan Booth, Nimah Amin, Shelby Wyatt and Dayana Mampasi, and the leader of the group, Clay Haas, a renowned political advisory strategist.

As the season progresses, Henry Roarke, the Speaker of the House, is appointed as the President of the United States, replacing Claire after a national scandal. Shortly after his inauguration, he requests for a new Constitutional Convention to rewrite the United States Constitution. In the days before it is due, the task force tries to stop Roarke from getting the votes needed to allow the convention to occur in Philadelphia. Alex resorts to a final strategy: she publicly broadcasts Roarke's recordings with the Federal Security Service and emails the evidence to the ACLU and other rights organizations. Due to Alex committing treason by releasing classified U.S. intelligence to the public at the Constitutional Convention, she is branded as a fugitive and an Interpol Red Notice for her arrest is issued. With Ryan, Alex leaves the U.S. on an aircraft to an unknown destination.

Episodes

Cast

Main
 Priyanka Chopra as Alex Parrish
 Jake McLaughlin as Ryan Booth
 Aunjanue Ellis as Miranda Shaw
 Yasmine Al Massri as Nimah and Raina Amin
 Johanna Braddy as Shelby Wyatt
 Russell Tovey as Harry Doyle
 Pearl Thusi as Dayana Mampasi
 Blair Underwood as Owen Hall

Recurring 
 Henry Czerny as Matthew Keyes
 Aarón Díaz as León Velez
 Tracy Ifeachor as Lydia Hall
 David Lim as Sebastian Chen
 Jay Armstrong Johnson as Will Olsen
 Graham Rogers as Caleb Haas
 Heléne Yorke as Leigh Davis
 Marcia Cross as Claire Haas
 Hunter Parrish as Clay Haas
 Krysta Rodriguez as Maxine Griffin
 Karolina Wydra as Sasha Barinov
 Jon Kortajarena as Felix Cordova
 Dennis Boutsikaris as Henry Roarke

Guest 
 Eliza Coupe as Hannah Wyland
 Nolan Gerard Funk as Daniel Sharp
 Laila Robins as General Katherine Richards
 David Call as Jeremy Miller
 Donna Murphy as Rebecca Sherman
 Li Jun Li as Iris Chang
 Lara Pulver as Charlotte Bishop
 Javier Muñoz as Gabriel Carrera

Production

Development

In March 2016, midway through the first season, American Broadcasting Company (ABC) announced that Quantico had been renewed for a second season. Following the season one finale, Joshua Safran told TV Guide the storyline of the second season, saying it will focus on the contrasting working ethics of the FBI and the CIA, saying: "The CIA is very much about getting information and figuring things out before they happen and before they grow into something that will be a bigger problem, whereas the FBI is very much about an immediate problem that arises that they need to fix or keep under control. They work together really well and I thought that was something I hadn't really seen before."

Safran also said they were planning to make the second season more mature and darker than its predecessor to minimize confusion for the viewers. He called the second season more cohesive and said its structure would mirror the first season. In another interview, he confirmed the narrative would be slower than the previous season's, saying, "It will be a little bit of flash forward, but the majority will be, what I like to call, the present". In an interview with TV Line, Safran said the show's storyline would switch to a single timeline following the fourteenth episode; his intention after resolving all of the storyline. The second season was produced by ABC Studios in association with The Mark Gordon Company and Random Acts Productions. Safran, Mark Gordon, Robert Partner, Nicholas Pepper and Jorge Zamacona served as the executive producers.

Casting and filming 
Following the season one finale, Safran confirmed the series regulars from the previous season would return. Safran expressed his interest in bringing back Cross's character Claire Haas; he thought it would be interesting to move her storyline forward. In early June 2016, Russell Tovey joined the show as a series regular, playing Harry Doyle, who was described as a "mischievous gadabout". The following month, Blair Underwood joined the regular cast, playing CIA officer Owen Hall. Pearl Thusi, the final new regular cast member, was cast as Dayana Mampasi, a "driven and disciplined type-A" attorney. Aarón Díaz was announced to have joined the series in a recurring role as photojournalist León Velez. 

Following Díaz's casting, it was reported that Tracy Ifeachor and David Lim were cast in recurring roles as Lydia Hall and Sebastian Chen, respectively. In late July 2016, Henry Czerny, who played the CIA director Matthew Keyes in the season 1 finale, joined the cast in a recurring role. Safran revealed he was important for the second season storyline. The casting of Hunter Parrish and Krysta Rodriguez in the recurring roles of Clay Haas and Maxine Griffin, respectively, was announced in early 2017. In March 2017, it was announced that Spanish supermodel Jon Kortajarena would be joining the cast as Felix Cordova, a political operative.

For the second season, the production moved to New York City as Safran felt it was "much more a New York story". The second season was primarily shot at the Silvercup Studios and exterior scenes were filmed on location. Filming started on July 13, 2016, in New York and ended in mid-March 2017.

Reception

Critical reception
The second season was well-received by critics. Jasef Wisener of TVOvermind gave the premiere episode a rating of three and a half star, writing that it set up its sophomore season "effectively". Negative reactions included Allison Nichols of TV Fanatic, who was critical of the opening episode owing to the "confusing time jumps" and the "head-spinning plotlines". The episodes following the winter finale when the show's narrative switched to a single timeline garnered further praise by such critics as Madison Vain of the Entertainment Weekly and Kelsey McKinney of the New York Magazine, especially for its focus on character development. The latter thought the show finally found its groove and wrote, "for the first time since its first season, Quantico actually seems to know where it is headed. It's quite a welcome development, and the newfound confidence ... makes Quantico a much more enjoyable show to watch." In a full five-stars review of the sixteenth episode, McKinney wrote, "the show is grappling more and more with the emotions that make us all human, not just the ones that drive the story forward". The series' plotlines involving the current real-life political scenario such as a Muslim registry and Black Lives Matter were also praised.

Accolades
The second season was nominated for two People's Choice Awards at the 43rd People's Choice Awards: Favorite Network TV Drama and Favorite Dramatic TV Actress, winning the latter for Chopra.

Ratings
The season two premiere on September 25, 2016, had 3.64 million viewers, with a 1.0 rating among the adults 1849 demographic; whereas the season one finale attracted 2.72 million viewers with 0.6 rating among adults 1849. A few episodes into the season, the ratings started to fall below 3 million viewers. After the mid-season finale, the show moved to Mondays at 10:00 p.m. from January 23, 2017, where it continued to air for the rest of the season. The second season averaged 4.53 million viewers overall with a 1.3 rating among adults 1849.

References

General references

External links 
 
 
 

2016 American television seasons
2017 American television seasons
Quantico (TV series)